Baumbast and R v Secretary of State for the Home Department (2002) C-413/99 is an EU law case, concerning the free movement of citizens in the European Union.

Facts
Mr Baumbast's Colombian family claimed their residence should be renewed by the Home Office, despite the fact that Mr Baumbast was no longer working in the EU and did not have emergency health insurance. Mr Baumbast, a German married a Colombian with two children. He worked in the UK with his family for three years, and left to work in Asia and Africa. He provided for his family, who stayed in the UK. They got German health insurance and went there to get it. The Home Office refused to renew his family's permits. The UK court found that Mr Baumbast was neither a worker nor a person covered by the Citizenship Directive 2004/38, and that sickness insurance did not cover emergency treatment in the UK. The ECJ was asked whether he had an independent right of residence as an EU citizen under TFEU art 21.

In a joined case, R were the children of an American woman and a French husband who worked in the UK. They were divorced, the children living with the mother.

Judgment
The Court of Justice held that Mr Baumbast and his family were not a burden on the UK state, so it would be disproportionate to refuse to recognise his Treaty-based right of residence simply because sickness insurance did not cover emergency treatment. The children in the R case were entitled to remain, to carry on their education, because there would otherwise be an obstacle to free movement. Furthermore, the mother had a right to remain, because Regulation 492/11, read in the light of ECHR art 8, 'necessarily implies' that the children are accompanied by their primary carer, even if the carer does not have independent rights under EU law. (Now Citizens' Rights Directive Article 12(3).)

See also

European Union law

Notes

References

Court of Justice of the European Union case law